Charmaine Wilkerson is a Caribbean-American journalist, writer, and author. She is known for her debut novel, Black Cake, which was a New York Times Bestseller.

Personal life 
Wilkerson is originally from New York. She has moved around a lot in her own life. She spent much of her childhood living in Jamaica and some time as an adult living in Los Angeles. She currently lives in Rome, where she has been living for over two decades.

Both of Wilkerson's parents are Caribbean-American. Her mother was born and raised in Jamaica. Her father was a textile artist.

Wilkerson is a graduate of Barnard College and Stanford University.

Career 
Wilkerson spent much of her career as a journalist. She began her reporting in California in a major agricultural area. For a period, she also worked for a United Nations agency with a focus on agriculture, poverty reduction, and hunger reduction.

As a writer, Wilkerson has published a number of short stories. Her debut novel, Black Cake, was released in 2022.

Black Cake 
Her first novel was published in 2022. Black Cake was a New York Times bestseller, a Read With Jenna book club pick, and a Book of the Month club pick.

Before the novel was even published, the TV rights were purchased by Oprah Winfrey's production company, Harpo Films, as the result of a bidding war. The on-screen adaptation is currently in development as a Hulu series.

With her debut novel, Wilkerson wanted to relay the importance and ability of transferring culture and stories through food. Black cake is a Caribbean food that Wilkerson's own mother made, though they called it rum pudding. Wilkerson herself bakes the dessert once a year.

Published works 

 (2022) Black Cake

References 

21st-century American novelists
Writers from New York (state)
Barnard College alumni
Stanford University alumni
21st-century American women writers
Year of birth missing (living people)
Living people